Gavin McLean (born 13 April 1965) is a New Zealand fencer. He competed in the individual épée event at the 1992 Summer Olympics.

References

External links
 

1965 births
Living people
New Zealand male épée fencers
Olympic fencers of New Zealand
Fencers at the 1992 Summer Olympics
Sportspeople from Neuilly-sur-Seine